Ardclach Bell Tower is an historic structure in Ardclach, Scottish Highlands. Dating to at least 1655, it is now a Category A listed building. It is believed to be the only tower and belfry combination in Scotland.

The structure, erected as a tower, belfry and keep, is a simple square with a two-storey tower with a double pitched roof. It is harled with ashlar dressings.

A monogram, "MGB", above the second-storey fireplace, refers to Margaret Grant Brodie, wife of Alexander Brodie of Lethen.

Gallery

References

Sources
George Bain, History of Nairnshire (1893) pp. 506–7
V. Gordon Childe and W Douglas Simpson, Illustrated Guide to Ancient Monuments (1967) p. 108

Category A listed buildings in Highland (council area)
1655 establishments in Scotland
Bell towers in the United Kingdom
Observation towers in the United Kingdom
Prisons in Scotland